Bodruddoza Md. Farhad Hossain is a Bangladesh Awami League politician and the incumbent Member of Parliament from Brahmanbaria-1.

Career
Hossain was elected to parliament  in a March 2018 by-election from Brahmanbaria-1 as a Bangladesh Awami League candidate. The by-elections was called following the death of incumbent Member of Parliament, Mohammad Sayedul Haque.

References

Awami League politicians
Living people
10th Jatiya Sangsad members
11th Jatiya Sangsad members
Year of birth missing (living people)